Swabi Maira is a historical village in Haripur District, Pakistan.

Populated places in Haripur District